François-Marie Arouet (21 November 169430 May 1778) was a French Enlightenment writer, historian, and philosopher. Known by his nom de plume M. de Voltaire (also), he was famous for his wit, and his criticism of Christianity—especially of the Roman Catholic Church—and of slavery. Voltaire was an advocate of freedom of speech, freedom of religion, and separation of church and state.

Voltaire was a versatile and prolific writer, producing works in almost every literary form, including plays, poems, novels, essays, histories, and scientific expositions. He wrote more than 20,000 letters and 2,000 books and pamphlets. Voltaire was one of the first authors to become renowned and commercially successful internationally. He was an outspoken advocate of civil liberties and was at constant risk from the strict censorship laws of the Catholic French monarchy. His polemics witheringly satirized intolerance, religious dogma, and the French institutions of his day. His best-known work and magnum opus, Candide, is a novella which comments on, criticizes, and ridicules many events, thinkers, and philosophies of his time.

Early life 
François-Marie Arouet was born in Paris, the youngest of the five children of François Arouet (1649–1722), a lawyer who was a minor treasury official, and his wife, Marie Marguerite Daumard, whose family was on the lowest rank of the French nobility. Some speculation surrounds Voltaire's date of birth, because he claimed he was born on 20 February 1694 as the illegitimate son of a nobleman, Guérin de Rochebrune or Roquebrune. Two of his older brothers—Armand-François and Robert—died in infancy, and his surviving brother Armand and sister Marguerite-Catherine were nine and seven years older, respectively. He was educated by the Jesuits at the Collège Louis-le-Grand (1704–1711), where he was taught Latin, theology, and rhetoric; later in life he became fluent in Italian, Spanish, and English.

By the time he left school, Voltaire had decided he wanted to be a writer, against the wishes of his father, who wanted him to become a lawyer. Voltaire, pretending to work in Paris as an assistant to a notary, spent much of his time writing poetry. When his father found out, he sent Voltaire to study law, this time in Caen, Normandy. But the young man continued to write, producing essays and historical studies. Voltaire's wit made him popular among some of the aristocratic families with whom he mixed. At The Hague, Voltaire fell in love with a French Protestant refugee named Catherine Olympe Dunoyer (known as 'Pimpette'). Their affair, considered scandalous, was discovered by de Châteauneuf and Voltaire was forced to return to France by the end of the year.

Most of Voltaire's early life revolved around Paris. From early on, Voltaire had trouble with the authorities for critiques of the government. As a result, he was twice sentenced to prison and once to temporary exile to England. One satirical verse, in which Voltaire accused the Régent of incest with his daughter, resulted in an eleven-month imprisonment in the Bastille. The Comédie-Française had agreed in January 1717 to stage his debut play, Œdipe, and it opened in mid-November 1718, seven months after his release. Its immediate critical and financial success established his reputation. Both the Régent and King George I of Great Britain presented Voltaire with medals as a mark of their appreciation.

He mainly argued for religious tolerance and freedom of thought. He campaigned to eradicate priestly and aristo-monarchical authority, and supported a constitutional monarchy that protects people's rights.

Arouet adopted the name Voltaire in 1718, following his incarceration at the Bastille. Its origin is unclear. The name also reverses the syllables of Airvault, his family's home town in the Poitou region.

Richard Holmes supports the anagrammatic derivation of the name, but adds that a writer such as Voltaire would have intended it to also convey connotations of speed and daring.

In a letter to Jean-Baptiste Rousseau in March 1719, Voltaire concludes by asking that, if Rousseau wishes to send him a return letter, he do so by addressing it to Monsieur de Voltaire. A postscript explains: "", ("I was so unhappy under the name of Arouet that I have taken another, primarily so as to cease to be confused with the poet Roi.") This probably refers to Adenes le Roi, and the 'oi' diphthong was then pronounced like modern 'ouai', so the similarity to 'Arouet' is clear, and thus, it could well have been part of his rationale. Voltaire is known also to have used at least 178 separate pen names during his lifetime.

Career

Early fiction 
Voltaire's next play, Artémire, set in ancient Macedonia, opened on 15 February 1720. It was a flop and only fragments of the text survive. He instead turned to an epic poem about Henry IV of France that he had begun in early 1717. Denied a licence to publish, in August 1722 Voltaire headed north to find a publisher outside France. On the journey, he was accompanied by his mistress, Marie-Marguerite de Rupelmonde, a young widow.

At Brussels, Voltaire and Rousseau met up for a few days, before Voltaire and his mistress continued northwards. A publisher was eventually secured in The Hague. In the Netherlands, Voltaire was struck and impressed by the openness and tolerance of Dutch society. On his return to France, he secured a second publisher in Rouen, who agreed to publish La Henriade clandestinely. After Voltaire's recovery from a month-long smallpox infection in November 1723, the first copies were smuggled into Paris and distributed. While the poem was an instant success, Voltaire's new play, Mariamne, was a failure when it first opened in March 1724. Heavily reworked, it opened at the Comédie-Française in April 1725 to a much-improved reception. It was among the entertainments provided at the wedding of Louis XV and Marie Leszczyńska in September 1725.

Great Britain 
In early 1726, the aristocratic chevalier de Rohan-Chabot taunted Voltaire about his change of name, and Voltaire retorted that his name would win the esteem of the world, while Rohan would sully his own. The furious Rohan arranged for his thugs to beat up Voltaire a few days later. Seeking redress, Voltaire challenged Rohan to a duel, but the powerful Rohan family arranged for Voltaire to be arrested and imprisoned without trial in the Bastille on 17 April 1726. Fearing indefinite imprisonment, Voltaire asked to be exiled to England as an alternative punishment, which the French authorities accepted. On 2 May, he was escorted from the Bastille to Calais and embarked for Britain.

In England, Voltaire lived largely in Wandsworth, with acquaintances including Everard Fawkener. From December 1727 to June 1728 he lodged at Maiden Lane, Covent Garden, now commemorated by a plaque, to be nearer to his British publisher. Voltaire circulated throughout English high society, meeting Alexander Pope, John Gay, Jonathan Swift, Lady Mary Wortley Montagu, Sarah, Duchess of Marlborough, and many other members of the nobility and royalty. Voltaire's exile in Great Britain greatly influenced his thinking. He was intrigued by Britain's constitutional monarchy in contrast to French absolutism, and by the country's greater freedom of speech and religion. He was influenced by the writers of the time, and developed an interest in English literature, especially Shakespeare, who was still little known in continental Europe. Despite pointing out Shakespeare's deviations from neoclassical standards, Voltaire saw him as an example for French drama, which, though more polished, lacked on-stage action. Later, however, as Shakespeare's influence began growing in France, Voltaire tried to set a contrary example with his own plays, decrying what he considered Shakespeare's barbarities. Voltaire may have been present at the funeral of Isaac Newton, and met Newton's niece, Catherine Conduitt. In 1727, he published two essays in English, Upon the Civil Wars of France, Extracted from Curious Manuscripts and Upon Epic Poetry of the European Nations, from Homer Down to Milton. Voltaire also published a letter about the Quakers after he attended one of their services.

After two and a half years in exile, Voltaire returned to France, and after a few months in Dieppe, the authorities permitted him to return to Paris. At a dinner, French mathematician Charles Marie de La Condamine proposed buying up the lottery that was organized by the French government to pay off its debts, and Voltaire joined the consortium, earning perhaps a million livres. He invested the money cleverly and on this basis managed to convince the Court of Finances of his responsible conduct, allowing him to take control of a trust fund inherited from his father. He was now indisputably rich.

Further success followed in 1732 with his play Zaïre, which when published in 1733 carried a dedication to Fawkener praising English liberty and commerce. He published his admiring essays on British government, literature, religion, and science in Letters Concerning the English Nation (London, 1733). In 1734, they were published in Rouen as Lettres philosophiques, causing a huge scandal. Published without approval of the royal censor, the essays lauded British constitutional monarchy as more developed and more respectful of human rights than its French counterpart, particularly regarding religious tolerance. The book was publicly burnt and banned, and Voltaire was again forced to flee Paris.

Château de Cirey 

In 1733, Voltaire met Émilie du Châtelet (Marquise du Châtelet), a mathematician and married mother of three, who was 12 years his junior and with whom he was to have an affair for 16 years. To avoid arrest after the publication of Lettres, Voltaire took refuge at her husband's château at Cirey on the borders of Champagne and Lorraine. Voltaire paid for the building's renovation, and Émilie's husband sometimes stayed at the château with his wife and her lover. The intellectual paramours collected around 21,000 books, an enormous number for the time. Together, they studied these books and performed scientific experiments at Cirey, including an attempt to determine the nature of fire.

Having learned from his previous brushes with the authorities, Voltaire began his habit of avoiding open confrontation with the authorities and denying any awkward responsibility. He continued to write plays, such as Mérope (or La Mérope française) and began his long researches into science and history. Again, a main source of inspiration for Voltaire were the years of his British exile, during which he had been strongly influenced by the works of Isaac Newton. Voltaire strongly believed in Newton's theories; he performed experiments in optics at Cirey, and was one of the promulgators of the famous story of Newton's inspiration from the falling apple, which he had learned from Newton's niece in London and first mentioned in his Letters.

In the fall of 1735, Voltaire was visited by Francesco Algarotti, who was preparing a book about Newton in Italian. Partly inspired by the visit, the Marquise translated Newton's Latin Principia into French, which remained the definitive French version into the 21st century. Both she and Voltaire were also curious about the philosophy of Gottfried Leibniz, a contemporary and rival of Newton. While Voltaire remained a firm Newtonian, the Marquise adopted certain aspects of Leibniz's critiques. Voltaire's own book Elements of the Philosophy of Newton made the great scientist accessible to a far greater public, and the Marquise wrote a celebratory review in the Journal des savants. Voltaire's work was instrumental in bringing about general acceptance of Newton's optical and gravitational theories in France, in contrast to the theories of Descartes.

Voltaire and the Marquise also studied history, particularly the great contributors to civilization. Voltaire's second essay in English had been "Essay upon the Civil Wars in France". It was followed by La Henriade, an epic poem on the French King Henri IV, glorifying his attempt to end the Catholic-Protestant massacres with the Edict of Nantes, which established religious toleration. There followed a historical novel on King Charles XII of Sweden. These, along with his Letters on the English, mark the beginning of Voltaire's open criticism of intolerance and established religions. Voltaire and the Marquise also explored philosophy, particularly metaphysical questions concerning the existence of God and the soul. Voltaire and the Marquise analyzed the Bible and concluded that much of its content was dubious. Voltaire's critical views on religion led to his belief in separation of church and state and religious freedom, ideas that he had formed after his stay in England.

In August 1736, Frederick the Great, then Crown Prince of Prussia and a great admirer of Voltaire, initiated a correspondence with him. That December, Voltaire moved to Holland for two months and became acquainted with the scientists Herman Boerhaave and Willem 's Gravesande. From mid-1739 to mid-1740 Voltaire lived largely in Brussels, at first with the Marquise, who was unsuccessfully attempting to pursue a 60-year-old family legal case regarding the ownership of two estates in Limburg. In July 1740, he traveled to the Hague on behalf of Frederick in an attempt to dissuade a dubious publisher, van Duren, from printing without permission Frederick's Anti-Machiavel. In September Voltaire and Frederick (now King) met for the first time in Moyland Castle near Cleves and in November Voltaire was Frederick's guest in Berlin for two weeks, followed by a meeting in September 1742 at Aix-la-Chapelle. Voltaire was sent to Frederick's court in 1743 by the French government as an envoy and spy to gauge Frederick's military intentions in the War of the Austrian Succession.

Though deeply committed to the Marquise, Voltaire by 1744 found life at her château confining. On a visit to Paris that year, he found a new love—his niece. At first, his attraction to Marie Louise Mignot was clearly sexual, as evidenced by his letters to her (only discovered in 1957). Much later, they lived together, perhaps platonically, and remained together until Voltaire's death. Meanwhile, the Marquise also took a lover, the Marquis de Saint-Lambert.

Prussia 

After the death of the Marquise in childbirth in September 1749, Voltaire briefly returned to Paris and in mid-1750 moved to Prussia at the invitation of Frederick the Great. The Prussian king (with the permission of Louis XV) made him a chamberlain in his household, appointed him to the Order of Merit, and gave him a salary of 20,000 French livres a year. He had rooms at Sanssouci and Charlottenburg Palace. Life went well for Voltaire at first, and in 1751 he completed Micromégas, a piece of science fiction involving ambassadors from another planet witnessing the follies of humankind. However, his relationship with Frederick began to deteriorate after he was accused of theft and forgery by a Jewish financier, Abraham Hirschel, who had invested in Saxon government bonds on behalf of Voltaire at a time when Frederick was involved in sensitive diplomatic negotiations with Saxony.

He encountered other difficulties: an argument with Maupertuis, the president of the Berlin Academy of Science and a former rival for Émilie's affections, provoked Voltaire's Diatribe du docteur Akakia ("Diatribe of Doctor Akakia"), which satirized some of Maupertuis's theories and his persecutions of a mutual acquaintance, Johann Samuel König. This greatly angered Frederick, who ordered all copies of the document burned. On 1 January 1752, Voltaire offered to resign as chamberlain and return his insignia of the Order of Merit; at first, Frederick refused until eventually permitting Voltaire to leave in March. On a slow journey back to France, Voltaire stayed at Leipzig and Gotha for a month each, and Kassel for two weeks, arriving at Frankfurt on 31 May. The following morning, he was detained at an inn by Frederick's agents, who held him in the city for over three weeks while Voltaire and Frederick argued by letter over the return of a satirical book of poetry Frederick had lent to Voltaire. Marie Louise joined him on 9 June. She and her uncle only left Frankfurt in July after she had defended herself from the unwanted advances of one of Frederick's agents, and Voltaire's luggage had been ransacked and valuable items taken.

Voltaire's attempts to vilify Frederick for his agents' actions at Frankfurt were largely unsuccessful, including his Mémoires pour Servir à la Vie de M. de Voltaire, published posthumously, in which he also explicitly made mention of Frederick's homosexuality, when he described how the king regularly invited pages, young cadets or lieutenants from his regiment to have coffee with him and then withdrew with the favourite for a quickie. However, the correspondence between them continued, and though they never met in person again, after the Seven Years' War they largely reconciled.

Geneva and Ferney 

Voltaire's slow progress toward Paris continued through Mainz, Mannheim, Strasbourg, and Colmar, but in January 1754 Louis XV banned him from Paris, and he turned for Geneva, near which he bought a large estate (Les Délices) in early 1755. Though he was received openly at first, the law in Geneva, which banned theatrical performances, and the publication of The Maid of Orleans against his will soured his relationship with Calvinist Genevans. In late 1758, he bought an even larger estate at Ferney, on the French side of the Franco-Swiss border. The town would adopt his name, calling itself Ferney-Voltaire, and this became its official name in 1878.

Early in 1759, Voltaire completed and published Candide, ou l'Optimisme (Candide, or Optimism). This satire on Leibniz's philosophy of optimistic determinism remains Voltaire's best-known work. He would stay in Ferney for most of the remaining 20 years of his life, frequently entertaining distinguished guests, such as James Boswell, Adam Smith, Giacomo Casanova, and Edward Gibbon. In 1764, he published one of his best-known philosophical works, the Dictionnaire philosophique, a series of articles mainly on Christian history and dogmas, a few of which were originally written in Berlin.

From 1762, as an unmatched intellectual celebrity, he began to champion unjustly persecuted individuals, most famously the Huguenot merchant Jean Calas. Calas had been tortured to death in 1763, supposedly because he had murdered his eldest son for wanting to convert to Catholicism. His possessions were confiscated, and his two daughters were taken from his widow and forced into Catholic convents. Voltaire, seeing this as a clear case of religious persecution, managed to overturn the conviction in 1765.

Voltaire was initiated into Freemasonry a little over a month before his death. On 4 April 1778, he attended la Loge des Neuf Sœurs in Paris, and became an Entered Apprentice Freemason. According to some sources, "Benjamin Franklin ... urged Voltaire to become a freemason; and Voltaire agreed, perhaps only to please Franklin." However, Franklin was merely a visitor at the time Voltaire was initiated, the two only met a month before Voltaire's death, and their interactions with each other were brief.

Death and burial 

In February 1778, Voltaire returned for the first time in over 25 years to Paris, among other reasons to see the opening of his latest tragedy, Irene. The five-day journey was too much for the 83-year-old, and he believed he was about to die on 28 February, writing "I die adoring God, loving my friends, not hating my enemies, and detesting superstition." However, he recovered, and in March he saw a performance of Irene, where he was treated by the audience as a returning hero.

He soon became ill again and died on 30 May 1778. The accounts of his deathbed have been numerous and varying, and it has not been possible to establish the details of what precisely occurred. His enemies related that he repented and accepted the last rites from a Catholic priest, or that he died in agony of body and soul, while his adherents told of his defiance to his last breath. According to one story of his last words, when the priest urged him to renounce Satan, he replied, "This is no time to make new enemies." However, this appears to have originated from a joke in a Massachusetts newspaper in 1856, and was only attributed to Voltaire in the 1970s.

Because of his well-known criticism of the Church, which he had refused to retract before his death, Voltaire was denied a Christian burial in Paris, but friends and relations managed to bury his body secretly at the Abbey of Scellières in Champagne, where Marie Louise's brother was abbé. His heart and brain were embalmed separately.

On 11 July 1791, the National Assembly of France, regarding Voltaire as a forerunner of the French Revolution, had his remains brought back to Paris and enshrined in the Panthéon. An estimated million people attended the procession, which stretched throughout Paris. There was an elaborate ceremony, including music composed for the event by André Grétry.

Writings

History 
Voltaire had an enormous influence on the development of historiography through his demonstration of fresh new ways to look at the past. Guillaume de Syon argues:

Voltaire's best-known histories are History of Charles XII (1731), The Age of Louis XIV (1751), and his Essay on the Customs and the Spirit of the Nations (1756). He broke from the tradition of narrating diplomatic and military events, and emphasized customs, social history and achievements in the arts and sciences. The Essay on Customs traced the progress of world civilization in a universal context, rejecting both nationalism and the traditional Christian frame of reference. Influenced by Bossuet's Discourse on Universal History (1682), he was the first scholar to attempt seriously a history of the world, eliminating theological frameworks, and emphasizing economics, culture and political history. He treated Europe as a whole rather than a collection of nations. He was the first to emphasize the debt of medieval culture to Middle Eastern civilization, but otherwise was weak on the Middle Ages. Although he repeatedly warned against political bias on the part of the historian, he did not miss many opportunities to expose the intolerance and frauds of the church over the ages. Voltaire advised scholars that anything contradicting the normal course of nature was not to be believed. Although he found evil in the historical record, he fervently believed reason and expanding literacy would lead to progress.

Voltaire explains his view of historiography in his article on "History" in Diderot's Encyclopédie: "One demands of modern historians more details, better ascertained facts, precise dates, more attention to customs, laws, mores, commerce, finance, agriculture, population." Voltaire's histories imposed the values of the Enlightenment on the past, but at the same time he helped free historiography from antiquarianism, Eurocentrism, religious intolerance and a concentration on great men, diplomacy, and warfare. Yale professor Peter Gay says Voltaire wrote "very good history", citing his "scrupulous concern for truths", "careful sifting of evidence", "intelligent selection of what is important", "keen sense of drama", and "grasp of the fact that a whole civilization is a unit of study".

Poetry 
From an early age, Voltaire displayed a talent for writing verse, and his first published work was poetry. He wrote two book-long epic poems, including the first ever written in French, the Henriade, and later, The Maid of Orleans, besides many other smaller pieces.

The Henriade was written in imitation of Virgil, using the alexandrine couplet reformed and rendered monotonous for modern readers but it was a huge success in the 18th and early 19th century, with sixty-five editions and translations into several languages. The epic poem transformed French King Henry IV into a national hero for his attempts at instituting tolerance with his Edict of Nantes. La Pucelle, on the other hand, is a burlesque on the legend of Joan of Arc.

Prose 

Many of Voltaire's prose works and romances, usually composed as pamphlets, were written as polemics. Candide attacks the passivity inspired by Leibniz's philosophy of optimism through the character Pangloss's frequent refrain that circumstances are the "best of all possible worlds". L'Homme aux quarante ecus (The Man of Forty Pieces of Silver) addresses social and political ways of the time; Zadig and others, the received forms of moral and metaphysical orthodoxy; and some were written to deride the Bible. In these works, Voltaire's ironic style, free of exaggeration, is apparent, particularly the restraint and simplicity of the verbal treatment. Candide in particular is the best example of his style. Voltaire also has—in common with Jonathan Swift—the distinction of paving the way for science fiction's philosophical irony, particularly in his Micromégas and the vignette "Plato's Dream" (1756).

In general, his criticism and miscellaneous writing show a similar style to Voltaire's other works. Almost all of his more substantive works, whether in verse or prose, are preceded by prefaces of one sort or another, which are models of his caustic yet conversational tone. In a vast variety of nondescript pamphlets and writings, he displays his skills at journalism. In pure literary criticism his principal work is the Commentaire sur Corneille, although he wrote many more similar works—sometimes (as in his Life and Notices of Molière) independently and sometimes as part of his Siècles.

Voltaire's works, especially his private letters, frequently urge the reader: "", or "crush the infamous". The phrase refers to contemporaneous abuses of power by royal and religious authorities, and the superstition and intolerance fomented by the clergy. He had seen and felt these effects in his own exiles, the burnings of his books and those of many others, and in the atrocious persecution of Jean Calas and François-Jean de la Barre. He stated in one of his most famous quotes that "Superstition sets the whole world in flames; philosophy quenches them."

The most oft-cited Voltaire quotation is apocryphal. He is incorrectly credited with writing, "I disapprove of what you say, but I will defend to the death your right to say it." These were not his words, but rather those of Evelyn Beatrice Hall, written under the pseudonym S. G. Tallentyre in her 1906 biographical book The Friends of Voltaire. Hall intended to summarize in her own words Voltaire's attitude towards Claude Adrien Helvétius and his controversial book De l'esprit, but her first-person expression was mistaken for an actual quotation from Voltaire. Her interpretation does capture the spirit of Voltaire's attitude towards Helvétius; it had been said Hall's summary was inspired by a quotation found in a 1770 Voltaire letter to an Abbot le Riche, in which he was reported to have said, "I detest what you write, but I would give my life to make it possible for you to continue to write." Nevertheless, scholars believe there must have again been misinterpretation, as the letter does not seem to contain any such quote.

Voltaire's first major philosophical work in his battle against "" was the Traité sur la tolérance (Treatise on Tolerance), exposing the Calas affair, along with the tolerance exercised by other faiths and in other eras (for example, by the Jews, the Romans, the Greeks and the Chinese). Then, in his Dictionnaire philosophique, containing such articles as "Abraham", "Genesis", "Church Council", he wrote about what he perceived as the human origins of dogmas and beliefs, as well as inhuman behavior of religious and political institutions in shedding blood over the quarrels of competing sects. Amongst other targets, Voltaire criticized France's colonial policy in North America, dismissing the vast territory of New France as "a few acres of snow" ("").

Letters 
Voltaire also engaged in an enormous amount of private correspondence during his life, totalling over 20,000 letters. Theodore Besterman's collected edition of these letters, completed only in 1964, fills 102 volumes. One historian called the letters "a feast not only of wit and eloquence but of warm friendship, humane feeling, and incisive thought."

In Voltaire's correspondence with Catherine the Great he derided democracy. He wrote, "Almost nothing great has ever been done in the world except by the genius and firmness of a single man combating the prejudices of the multitude."

Religious and philosophical views 

Like other key Enlightenment thinkers, Voltaire was a deist. He challenged orthodoxy by asking: "What is faith? Is it to believe that which is evident? No. It is perfectly evident to my mind that there exists a necessary, eternal, supreme, and intelligent being. This is no matter of faith, but of reason."

In a 1763 essay, Voltaire supported the toleration of other religions and ethnicities: "It does not require great art, or magnificently trained eloquence, to prove that Christians should tolerate each other. I, however, am going further: I say that we should regard all men as our brothers. What? The Turk my brother? The Chinaman my brother? The Jew? The Siam? Yes, without doubt; are we not all children of the same father and creatures of the same God?"

In one of his many denunciations of priests of every religious sect, Voltaire describes them as those who "rise from an incestuous bed, manufacture a hundred versions of God, then eat and drink God, then piss and shit God."

Christianity 
Historians have described Voltaire's description of the history of Christianity as "propagandistic". His Dictionnaire philosophique is responsible for the myth that the early Church had fifty gospels before settling on the standard canonical four as well as propagating the myth that the canon of the New Testament was decided at the First Council of Nicaea. Voltaire is partially responsible for the misattribution of the expression Credo quia absurdum to the Church Fathers. Furthermore, despite the death of Hypatia being the result of finding herself in the crossfires of a mob (likely Christian) during a political feud in 4th-century Alexandria, Voltaire promoted the theory that she was stripped naked and murdered by the minions of the bishop Cyril of Alexandria, concluding by stating that "when one finds a beautiful woman completely naked, it is not for the purpose of massacring her." Voltaire meant for this argument to bolster one of his anti-Catholic tracts. In a letter to Frederick II, King of Prussia, dated 5 January 1767, he wrote about Christianity:

In La bible enfin expliquée, he expressed the following attitude to lay reading of the Bible: It is characteristic of fanatics who read the holy scriptures to tell themselves: God killed, so I must kill; Abraham lied, Jacob deceived, Rachel stole: so I must steal, deceive, lie. But, wretch, you are neither Rachel, nor Jacob, nor Abraham, nor God; you are just a mad fool, and the popes who forbade the reading of the Bible were extremely wise.

Voltaire's opinion of the Bible was mixed. Although influenced by Socinian works such as the Bibliotheca Fratrum Polonorum, Voltaire's skeptical attitude to the Bible separated him from Unitarian theologians like Fausto Sozzini or even Biblical-political writers like John Locke. His statements on religion also brought down on him the fury of the Jesuits and in particular Claude-Adrien Nonnotte. This did not hinder his religious practice, though it did win for him a bad reputation in certain religious circles. The deeply Christian Wolfgang Amadeus Mozart wrote to his father the year of Voltaire's death, saying, "The arch-scoundrel Voltaire has finally kicked the bucket ..." Voltaire was later deemed to influence Edward Gibbon in claiming that Christianity was a contributor to the fall of the Roman Empire in his book The History of the Decline and Fall of the Roman Empire:As Christianity advances, disasters befall the [Roman] empire—arts, science, literature, decay—barbarism and all its revolting concomitants are made to seem the consequences of its decisive triumph—and the unwary reader is conducted, with matchless dexterity, to the desired conclusion—the abominable Manicheism of Candide, and, in fact, of all the productions of Voltaire's historic school—viz., "that instead of being a merciful, ameliorating, and benignant visitation, the religion of Christians would rather seem to be a scourge sent on man by the author of all evil."

However, Voltaire also acknowledged the self-sacrifice of Christians. He wrote: "Perhaps there is nothing greater on earth than the sacrifice of youth and beauty, often of high birth, made by the gentle sex in order to work in hospitals for the relief of human misery, the sight of which is so revolting to our delicacy. Peoples separated from the Roman religion have imitated but imperfectly so generous a charity." Yet, according to Daniel-Rops, Voltaire's "hatred of religion increased with the passage of years. The attack, launched at first against clericalism and theocracy, ended in a furious assault upon Holy Scripture, the dogmas of the Church, and even upon the person of Jesus Christ Himself, who [he] depicted now as a degenerate." Voltaire's reasoning may be summed up in his well-known saying, "Those who can make you believe absurdities can make you commit atrocities."

Judaism 
According to Orthodox rabbi Joseph Telushkin, the most significant Enlightenment hostility against Judaism was found in Voltaire; 30 of the 118 articles in his Dictionnaire philosophique dealt with Jews or Judaism, describing them in consistently negative ways. For example, in Voltaire's A Philosophical Dictionary, he wrote of Jews: "In short, we find in them only an ignorant and barbarous people, who have long united the most sordid avarice with the most detestable superstition and the most invincible hatred for every people by whom they are tolerated and enriched." Telushkin states that Voltaire did not limit his attack to aspects of Judaism that Christianity used as a foundation, repeatedly making it clear that he despised Jews.

On the other hand, Peter Gay, a contemporary authority on the Enlightenment, also points to Voltaire's remarks (for instance, that the Jews were more tolerant than the Christians) in the Traité sur la tolérance and surmises that "Voltaire struck at the Jews to strike at Christianity". Whatever anti-semitism Voltaire may have felt, Gay suggests, derived from negative personal experience.

Arthur Hertzberg, a Conservative Rabbi, claims that Gay's second suggestion is also untenable, as Voltaire himself denied its validity when he remarked that he had "forgotten about much larger bankruptcies through Christians". However, Bertram Schwarzbach's far more detailed studies of Voltaire's dealings with Jewish people throughout his life concluded that he was anti-biblical, not anti-semitic. His remarks on the Jews and their "superstitions" were essentially no different from his remarks on Christians.

Voltaire said of the Jews that they "have surpassed all nations in impertinent fables, in bad conduct and in barbarism. You deserve to be punished, for this is your destiny." He further said, "They are, all of them, born with raging fanaticism in their hearts, just as the Bretons and the Germans are born with blond hair. I would not be in the least bit surprised if these people would not some day become deadly to the human race."

Some authors link Voltaire's anti-Judaism to his polygenism. According to Joxe Azurmendi this anti-Judaism has a relative importance in Voltaire's philosophy of history. However, Voltaire's anti-Judaism influenced later authors like Ernest Renan.

Voltaire did have a Jewish friend, Daniel de Fonseca, whom he esteemed highly, and proclaimed him as "the only philosopher, perhaps, among the Jews of his time".

Voltaire had also condemned the persecution of Jews on several occasions including in his work Henriade, and never advocated violence or attacks against them. According to the historian Will Durant, Voltaire had praised the simplicity, sobriety, regularity, and industry of Jews, however subsequently, Voltaire became strongly anti-Semitic after some regrettable personal financial transactions and quarrels with Jewish financiers. In his Essai sur les moeurs Voltaire had denounced the ancient Hebrews using strong language; a Catholic priest had protested against this censure. The anti-Semitic passages in Voltaire's Dictionnaire philosophique were criticized by Isaac De Pinto in 1762. Subsequently, Voltaire agreed with the criticism of the anti-Semitic passages and stated that De Pinto's letter convinced that there are "highly intelligent and cultivated people" among the Jews and that he had been "wrong to attribute to a whole nation the vices of some individuals"; he also promised to revise the objectionable passages for forthcoming editions of the Dictionnaire philosophique, but failed to do so.

Islam 
Voltaire's views about Islam were generally negative, and he found its holy book, the Quran, to be ignorant of the laws of physics. In a 1740 letter to Frederick II of Prussia, Voltaire ascribes to Muhammad a brutality that "is assuredly nothing any man can excuse" and suggests that his following stemmed from superstition; Voltaire continued, "But that a camel-merchant should stir up insurrection in his village; that in league with some miserable followers he persuades them that he talks with the angel Gabriel; that he boasts of having been carried to heaven, where he received in part this unintelligible book, each page of which makes common sense shudder; that, to pay homage to this book, he delivers his country to iron and flame; that he cuts the throats of fathers and kidnaps daughters; that he gives to the defeated the choice of his religion or death: this is assuredly nothing any man can excuse, at least if he was not born a Turk, or if superstition has not extinguished all natural light in him."

In 1748, after having read Henri de Boulainvilliers and George Sale, he wrote again about Mohammed and Islam in "De l'Alcoran et de Mahomet" ("On the Quran and on Mohammed"). In this essay, Voltaire maintained that Mohammed was a "sublime charlatan". Drawing on complementary information in Herbelot's "Oriental Library", Voltaire, according to René Pomeau, adjudged the Quran, with its "contradictions, ... absurdities, ... anachronisms", to be "rhapsody, without connection, without order, and without art". Thus he "henceforward conceded" that "if his book was bad for our times and for us, it was very good for his contemporaries, and his religion even more so. It must be admitted that he removed almost all of Asia from idolatry" and that "it was difficult for such a simple and wise religion, taught by a man who was constantly victorious, could hardly fail to subjugate a portion of the earth." He considered that "its civil laws are good; its dogma is admirable which it has in common with ours" but that "his means are shocking; deception and murder".

In his Essay on the Manners and Spirit of Nations (published 1756), Voltaire deals with the history of Europe before Charlemagne to the dawn of the age of Louis XIV, and that of the colonies and the East. As a historian, he devoted several chapters to Islam, Voltaire highlighted the Arabian, Turkish courts, and conducts. Here he called Mohammed a "poet", and stated that he was not an illiterate. As a "legislator", he "changed the face of part of Europe [and] one half of Asia." In chapter VI, Voltaire finds similarities between Arabs and ancient Hebrews, that they both kept running to battle in the name of God, and sharing a passion for the spoils of war. Voltaire continues that, "It is to be believed that Mohammed, like all enthusiasts, violently struck by his ideas, first presented them in good faith, strengthened them with fantasy, fooled himself in fooling others, and supported through necessary deceptions a doctrine which he considered good." He thus compares "the genius of the Arab people" with "the genius of the ancient Romans".

According to Malise Ruthven, as Voltaire learned more about Islam his opinion of the faith became more positive. As a result, his book, Fanaticism (Mohammad the Prophet), inspired Goethe, who was attracted to Islam, to write a drama on this theme, though completed only the poem Mahomets-Gesang ("Mahomet's Singing").

Drama Mahomet 

The tragedy Fanaticism, or Mahomet the Prophet was written in 1736 by Voltaire. The play is a study of religious fanaticism and self-serving manipulation. The character Muhammad orders the murder of his critics. Voltaire described the play as "written in opposition to the founder of a false and barbarous sect."

Voltaire described Muhammad as an "impostor", a "false prophet", a "fanatic" and a "hypocrite". Defending the play, Voltaire said that he "tried to show in it into what horrible excesses fanaticism, led by an impostor, can plunge weak minds". When Voltaire wrote in 1742 to César de Missy, he described Mohammed as deceitful.

In his play, Mohammed was "whatever trickery can invent that is most atrocious and whatever fanaticism can accomplish that is most horrifying. Mahomet here is nothing other than Tartuffe with armies at his command." After later having judged that he had made Mohammed in his play "somewhat nastier than he really was", Voltaire claims that Muhammad stole the idea of an angel weighing both men and women from Zoroastrians, who are often referred to as "Magi". Voltaire continues about Islam, saying:

In a 1745 letter recommending the play to Pope Benedict XIV, Voltaire described Muhammad as "the founder of a false and barbarous sect" and "a false prophet". Voltaire wrote: "Your holiness will pardon the liberty taken by one of the lowest of the faithful, though a zealous admirer of virtue, of submitting to the head of the true religion this performance, written in opposition to the founder of a false and barbarous sect. To whom could I with more propriety inscribe a satire on the cruelty and errors of a false prophet, than to the vicar and representative of a God of truth and mercy?" His view was modified slightly for Essai sur les Moeurs et l'Esprit des Nations, although it remained negative. In 1751, Voltaire performed his play Mohamet once again, with great success.

Hinduism 
Commenting on the sacred texts of the Hindus, the Vedas, Voltaire observed: The Veda was the most precious gift for which the West had ever been indebted to the East.

He regarded Hindus as "a peaceful and innocent people, equally incapable of hurting others or of defending themselves." Voltaire was himself a supporter of animal rights and was a vegetarian. He used the antiquity of Hinduism to land what he saw as a devastating blow to the Bible's claims and acknowledged that the Hindus' treatment of animals showed a shaming alternative to the immorality of European imperialists.

Confucianism 

Works attributed to Confucius were translated into European languages through the agency of Jesuit missionaries stationed in China. Matteo Ricci was among the earliest to report on the teachings of Confucius, and father Prospero Intorcetta wrote about the life and works of Confucius in Latin in 1687.

Translations of Confucian texts influenced European thinkers of the period, particularly among the Deists and other philosophical groups of the Enlightenment who hoped to improve European morals and institutions by the serene doctrines of the East. Voltaire shared these hopes, seeing Confucian rationalism as an alternative to Christian dogma. He praised Confucian ethics and politics, portraying the sociopolitical hierarchy of China as a model for Europe.

With the translation of Confucian texts during the Enlightenment, the concept of a meritocracy reached intellectuals in the West, who saw it as an alternative to the traditional Ancien Régime of Europe. Voltaire wrote favourably of the idea, claiming that the Chinese had "perfected moral science" and advocating an economic and political system after the Chinese model.

Views on race and slavery 

Voltaire rejected the biblical Adam and Eve story and was a polygenist who speculated that each race had entirely separate origins. According to William Cohen, like most other polygenists, Voltaire believed that because of their different origins, Black Africans did not entirely share the natural humanity of white Europeans. According to David Allen Harvey, Voltaire often invoked racial differences as a means to attack religious orthodoxy, and the Biblical account of creation. Other historians, instead, have suggested that Voltaire's support for polygenism was more heavily encouraged by his investments in the French Compagnie des Indes and other colonial enterprises that engaged in the slave trade.

His most famous remark on slavery is found in Candide, where the hero is horrified to learn "at what price we eat sugar in Europe" after coming across a slave in French Guiana who has been mutilated for escaping, who opines that, if all human beings have common origins as the Bible taught, it makes them cousins, concluding that "no one could treat their relatives more horribly". Elsewhere, he wrote caustically about "whites and Christians [who] proceed to purchase negroes cheaply, in order to sell them dear in America". Voltaire has been accused of supporting the slave trade as per a letter attributed to him, although it has been suggested that this letter is a forgery "since no satisfying source attests to the letter's existence."

In his Philosophical Dictionary, Voltaire endorses Montesquieu's criticism of the slave trade: "Montesquieu was almost always in error with the learned, because he was not learned, but he was almost always right against the fanatics and the promoters of slavery."

Zeev Sternhell argues that despite his shortcomings, Voltaire was a forerunner of liberal pluralism in his approach to history and non-European cultures. Voltaire wrote, "We have slandered the Chinese because their metaphysics is not the same as ours ... This great misunderstanding about Chinese rituals has come about because we have judged their usages by ours, for we carry the prejudices of our contentious spirit to the end of the world." In speaking of Persia, he condemned Europe's "ignorant audacity" and "ignorant credulity". When writing about India, he declares, "It is time for us to give up the shameful habit of slandering all sects and insulting all nations!" In Essai sur les mœurs et l'esprit des nations, he defended the integrity of the Native Americans and wrote favorably of the Inca Empire.

Appreciation and influence 
According to Victor Hugo: "To name Voltaire is to characterize the entire eighteenth century." Goethe regarded Voltaire as the greatest literary figure of modern times, and possibly of all time. According to Diderot, Voltaire's influence would extend far into the future. Napoleon commented that till he was sixteen he "would have fought for Rousseau against the friends of Voltaire, today it is the opposite ... The more I read Voltaire the more I love him. He is a man always reasonable, never a charlatan, never a fanatic" (though he later criticized Voltaire's work Mahomet during his captivity on Saint Helena). Frederick the Great commented on his good fortune for having lived in the age of Voltaire, and corresponded with him throughout his reign until Voltaire's death. On May 12, 1760, Frederick wrote: "For my part I shall go to Hades and tell Virgil that a Frenchman has surpassed him in his own art. I shall say as much to Sophocles and Euripides; I shall speak to Thucydides of your histories, to Quintus Curtius of your Charles XII; and perhaps I shall be stoned by these jealous dead because a single man has united all their different merits in himself." In England, Voltaire's views influenced Godwin, Paine, Mary Wollstonecraft, Bentham, Byron and Shelley. Macaulay made note of the fear that Voltaire's very name incited in tyrants and fanatics.

In Russia, Catherine the Great had been reading Voltaire for sixteen years prior to becoming Empress in 1762. In October 1763, she began a correspondence with the philosopher that continued till his death. The content of these letters has been described as being akin to a student writing to a teacher. Upon Voltaire's death, the Empress purchased his library, which was then transported and placed in The Hermitage. Alexander Herzen remarked that "The writings of the egoist Voltaire did more for liberation than those of the loving Rousseau did for brotherhood." In his famous letter to N. V. Gogol, Vissarion Belinsky wrote that Voltaire "stamped out the fires of fanaticism and ignorance in Europe by ridicule."

In his native Paris, Voltaire was remembered as the defender of Jean Calas and Pierre Sirven. Although Voltaire's campaign had failed to secure the annulment of la Barre's execution for blasphemy against Christianity, the criminal code that sanctioned the execution was revised during Voltaire's lifetime. In 1764, Voltaire successfully intervened and secured the release of Claude Chamont, arrested for attending Protestant services. When Comte de Lally was executed for treason in 1766, Voltaire wrote a 300-page document in his defense. Subsequently, in 1778, the judgment against de Lally was expunged just before Voltaire's death. The Genevan Protestant minister Pomaret once said to Voltaire, "You seem to attack Christianity, and yet you do the work of a Christian." Frederick the Great noted the significance of a philosopher capable of influencing judges to change their unjust decisions, commenting that this alone is sufficient to ensure the prominence of Voltaire as a humanitarian.

Under the French Third Republic, anarchists and socialists often invoked Voltaire's writings in their struggles against militarism, nationalism, and the Catholic Church. The section condemning the futility and imbecility of war in the Dictionnaire philosophique was a frequent favorite, as were his arguments that nations can only grow at the expense of others. Following the liberation of France from the Vichy regime in 1944, Voltaire's 250th birthday was celebrated in both France and the Soviet Union, honoring him as "one of the most feared opponents" of the Nazi collaborators and someone "whose name symbolizes freedom of thought, and hatred of prejudice, superstition, and injustice."

Jorge Luis Borges stated that "not to admire Voltaire is one of the many forms of stupidity" and included his short fiction such as Micromégas in "The Library of Babel" and "A Personal Library." Gustave Flaubert believed that France had erred gravely by not following the path forged by Voltaire instead of Rousseau. Most architects of modern America were adherents of Voltaire's views. According to Will Durant:

Voltaire and Rousseau 
Voltaire's junior contemporary Jean-Jacques Rousseau commented on how Voltaire's book Letters on the English played a great role in his intellectual development. Having written some literary works and also some music, in December 1745 Rousseau wrote a letter introducing himself to Voltaire, who was by then the most prominent literary figure in France, to which Voltaire replied with a polite response. Subsequently, when Rousseau sent Voltaire a copy of his book Discourse on Inequality, Voltaire replied, noting his disagreement with the views expressed in the book:

Subsequently, commenting on Rousseau's romantic novel Julie, or the New Heloise, Voltaire stated:

Voltaire quipped that the first half of Julie had been written in a brothel and the second half in a lunatic asylum. In his Lettres sur La Nouvelle Heloise, written under a pseudonym, Voltaire criticized Rousseau's grammatical mistakes:

In reviewing Rousseau's book Emile, Voltaire dismissed it as "a hodgepodge of a silly wet nurse in four volumes, with forty pages against Christianity, among the boldest ever known." He expressed admiration for the section titled Profession of Faith of the Savoyard Vicar, calling it "fifty good pages ... it is regrettable that they should have been written by ... such a knave." He went on to predict that Emile would be forgotten within a month.

In 1764, Rousseau published Lettres de la montagne on religion and politics. In the fifth letter he wondered why Voltaire had not been able to imbue the Genevan councilors, who frequently met him, "with that spirit of tolerance which he preaches without cease, and of which he sometimes has need". The letter continued with an imaginary speech in the voice of Voltaire, acknowledging authorship of the heretical book Sermon of the Fifty, which the real Voltaire had repeatedly denied.

In 1772, when a priest sent Rousseau a pamphlet denouncing Voltaire, Rousseau responded by defending his rival:

In 1778, when Voltaire was given unprecedented honors at the Théâtre-Français, an acquaintance of Rousseau ridiculed the event. This was met by a sharp retort from Rousseau:

On 2 July 1778, Rousseau died one month after Voltaire. In October 1794, Rousseau's remains were moved to the Panthéon near the remains of Voltaire.

Louis XVI, while incarcerated in the Temple, lamented that Rousseau and Voltaire had "destroyed France".

Legacy 

Voltaire perceived the French bourgeoisie to be too small and ineffective, the aristocracy to be parasitic and corrupt, the commoners as ignorant and superstitious, and the Church as a static and oppressive force useful only on occasion as a counterbalance to the rapacity of kings, although all too often, even more rapacious itself. Voltaire distrusted democracy, which he saw as propagating the idiocy of the masses. Voltaire long thought only an enlightened monarch could bring about change, given the social structures of the time and the extremely high rates of illiteracy, and that it was in the king's rational interest to improve the education and welfare of his subjects. But his disappointments and disillusions with Frederick the Great changed his philosophy somewhat, and soon gave birth to one of his most enduring works, his novella Candide, ou l'Optimisme (Candide, or Optimism, 1759), which ends with a new conclusion of quietism: "It is up to us to cultivate our garden." His most polemical and ferocious attacks on intolerance and religious persecutions indeed began to appear a few years later. Candide was also burned, and Voltaire jokingly claimed the actual author was a certain 'Demad' in a letter, where he reaffirmed the main polemical stances of the text.

He is remembered and honored in France as a courageous polemicist who indefatigably fought for civil rights (such as the right to a fair trial and freedom of religion) and who denounced the hypocrisies and injustices of the Ancien Régime. The Ancien Régime involved an unfair balance of power and taxes between the three Estates: clergy and nobles on one side, the commoners and middle class, who were burdened with most of the taxes, on the other. He particularly had admiration for the ethics and government as exemplified by the Chinese philosopher Confucius.

Voltaire is also known for many memorable aphorisms, such as "" ("If God did not exist, it would be necessary to invent him"), contained in a verse epistle from 1768, addressed to the anonymous author of a controversial work on The Three Impostors. But far from being the cynical remark it is often taken for, it was meant as a retort to atheistic opponents such as d'Holbach, Grimm, and others.

He has had his detractors among his later colleagues. The Scottish Victorian writer Thomas Carlyle argued that "Voltaire read history, not with the eye of devout seer or even critic, but through a pair of mere anti-catholic spectacles."

The town of Ferney, where Voltaire lived out the last 20 years of his life, was officially named Ferney-Voltaire in honor of its most famous resident, in 1878. His château is a museum. Voltaire's library is preserved intact in the National Library of Russia at Saint Petersburg. In the Zurich of 1916, the theatre and performance group who would become the early avant-garde Dada movement named their theater the Cabaret Voltaire. A late-20th-century industrial music group later adopted the same name. Astronomers have bestowed his name on the Voltaire crater on Deimos and the asteroid 5676 Voltaire.

Voltaire was also known to have been an advocate for coffee, drinking it at every turn: fifty times a day, according to Frederick the Great; three times a day, said Wagniere. It has been suggested that high amounts of caffeine stimulated his creativity. His great-grand-niece was the mother of Pierre Teilhard de Chardin, a Catholic philosopher and Jesuit priest. His book Candide was listed as one of The 100 Most Influential Books Ever Written, by Martin Seymour-Smith.

In the 1950s, the bibliographer and translator Theodore Besterman started to collect, transcribe and publish all of Voltaire's writings. He founded the Voltaire Institute and Museum in Geneva where he began publishing collected volumes of Voltaire's correspondence. On his death in 1976, he left his collection to the University of Oxford, where the Voltaire Foundation became established as a department. The Foundation has continued to publish the Complete Works of Voltaire, a complete chronological series expected to reach completion in 2018 with around 200 volumes, fifty years after the series began. It also publishes the series Oxford University Studies in the Enlightenment, begun by Bestermann as Studies on Voltaire and the Eighteenth Century, which has reached more than 500 volumes.

Works

Non-fiction 
 Letters on the Quakers (1727)
 Letters concerning the English nation (London, 1733) (French version entitled Lettres philosophiques sur les Anglais, Rouen, 1734), revised as Letters on the English (circa 1778)
 "Le Mondain" (1736)
 Sept Discours en Vers sur l'Homme (1738)
 The Elements of Sir Isaac Newton's Philosophy (1738; 2nd expanded ed. 1745)
 Dictionnaire philosophique (1752)
 The Sermon of the Fifty (1759)
 The Calas Affair: A Treatise on Tolerance (1762)
 Traité sur la tolérance (1763)
 Ce qui plaît aux dames (1764)
 Idées républicaines (1765)
 La Philosophie de l'histoire (1765)
 Questions sur les Miracles (1765)
 L'Ingénu (1767)
 La Princesse de Babylone (1768)
 Des singularités de la nature (1768)
 Les Dialogues d’Evhémère (1777)

History
 History of Charles XII, King of Sweden (1731)
 The Age of Louis XIV (1751)
 The Age of Louis XV (1746–1752; published separately 1768)
 Annals of the Empire – Charlemagne, AD 742 – Henry VII 1313, Vol. I (1754)
 Annals of the Empire – Louis of Bavaria, 1315 to Ferdinand II 1631 Vol. II (1754)
 Essay on Universal History, the Manners, and Spirit of Nations (1756)
 History of the Russian Empire Under Peter the Great (Vol. I 1759; Vol. II 1763)

Novellas 
 The One-eyed Street Porter, Cosi-sancta (1715)
 Micromégas (1738)
 The World as it Goes (1750)
 Memnon (1750)
 Bababec and the Fakirs (1750)
 Timon (1755)
 Plato's Dream (1756)
 The Travels of Scarmentado (1756)
 The Two Consoled Ones (1756)
 Zadig, or, Destiny (1757)
 Candide, or Optimism (1758)
 Story of a Good Brahman (1759)
 The King of Boutan (1761)
 The City of Cashmere (1760)
 An Indian Adventure (1764)
 The White and the Black (1764)
 Jeannot and Colin (1764)
 The Blind Judges of Colors (1766)
 The Princess of Babylon (1768)
 The Man with Forty Crowns (1768)
 The Letters of Amabed (1769)
 The Huron, or Pupil of Nature (1771)
 The White Bull (1772)
 An Incident of Memory (1773)
 The History of Jenni (1774)
 The Travels of Reason (1774)
 The Ears of Lord Chesterfield and Chaplain Goudman (1775)

Plays 
Voltaire wrote between fifty and sixty plays, including a few unfinished ones. Among them are:
 Œdipe (1718)
 Artémire (1720)
 Mariamne (1724)
 Brutus (1730)
 Éryphile (1732)
 Zaïre (1732), inspiration for Zaira, opera by Vincenzo Bellini (1829)
 Alzire, ou les Américains (1736), inspiration for Alzira, opera by Giuseppe Verdi (1845)
 Zulima (1740)
 Mahomet (1741)
 Mérope (1743)
 La princesse de Navarre (1745)
 Sémiramis (1748), inspiration for Semiramide, opera by Gioachino Rossini (1823)
 Nanine (1749)
 L'Orphelin de la Chine (1755)
 Socrate (published 1759)
 La Femme qui a Raison (1759)
 Tancrède (1760), inspiration for Tancredi, opera by Gioachino Rossini (1813)
 Don Pèdre, roi de Castille (1774)
 Sophonisbe (1774)
 Irène (1778)
 Agathocle (1779)

Collected works 
 Oeuvres complètes de Voltaire, A. Beuchot (ed.). 72 vols. (1829–1840)
 Oeuvres complètes de Voltaire, Louis E.D. Moland and G. Bengesco (eds.). 52 vols. (1877–1885)
 Oeuvres complètes de Voltaire, Theodore Besterman, et al. (eds.). 144 vols. (1968–2018)

See also 

 Boulevard Voltaire
 List of liberal theorists
 Mononymous persons
 Voltaire Human Rights Awards, Australia
 Voltaire Foundation
 Voltaire Prize for Tolerance, International Understanding and Respect for Differences, University of Potsdam, Germany

References

Informational notes

Citations

Sources

Further reading 

 App, Urs. The Birth of Orientalism. Philadelphia: University of Pennsylvania Press, 2010 (hardcover); contains a 60-page chapter (pp. 15–76) on Voltaire as a pioneer of Indomania and his use of fake Indian texts in anti-Christian propaganda.
 Besterman, Theodore, Voltaire, (1969).
 Brumfitt, J. H. Voltaire: Historian (1958) online edition .

 Davidson, Ian, Voltaire: A Life, London, Profile Books, 2010. .
 Gay, Peter, Voltaire's Politics, The Poet as Realist, Yale University, 1988.
 Hadidi, Djavâd, Voltaire et l'Islam, Publications Orientalistes de France, 1974. .
 Knapp, Bettina L. Voltaire Revisited (2000).
 Mason, Haydn, Voltaire: A Biography (1981) .
 
 Muller, Jerry Z., 2002. The Mind and the Market: Capitalism in Western Thought. Anchor Books. .
 Quinones, Ricardo J. Erasmus and Voltaire: Why They Still Matter (University of Toronto Press; 2010) 240 pages; Draws parallels between the two thinkers as voices of moderation with relevance today.
 Schwarzbach, Bertram Eugene, Voltaire's Old Testament Criticism, Librairie Droz, Geneva, 1971.
 Torrey, Norman L., The Spirit of Voltaire, Columbia University Press, 1938.
 
 
 Wright, Charles Henry Conrad, A History of French Literature, Oxford University Press, 1912.
 The Cambridge Companion to Voltaire, ed. by Nicholas Cronk, 2009.

In French
 Korolev, S. "Voltaire et la reliure des livres. Revue Voltaire. Paris, 2013. No. 13. pp. 233–40.
 René Pomeau, La Religion de Voltaire, Librairie Nizet, Paris, 1974.
 Valérie Crugten-André, La vie de Voltaire

Primary sources
 Morley, J., The Works of Voltaire: A Contemporary Version (21 vol.; 1901), online edition

External links 

 
 
 
 
 Gabrielle Émilie Le Tonnelier de Breteuil Marquise du Châtelet, School of Mathematics and Statistics, University of St Andrews, Scotland
 
 The Société Voltaire
 An analysis of Voltaire's texts (in the "textes" topic) 
 Complete French ebooks of Voltaire 
 Institut et Musée Voltaire, Geneva, Switzerland 
 Works by Voltaire edited at athena.unige.ch 
 Internet Encyclopaedia of Philosophy on Voltaire
 Complete listing of current published editions of Voltaire's works
 Online Library of Liberty – The Works of Voltaire (1901). Some volumes, including mostly the unabridged Dictionnaire philosophique, translated by William F. Fleming
 Voltaire's works: works: text, concordances and frequency list
 Voltaire's writings from Philosophical Dictionary. Selected and Translated by H.I. Woolf, 1924
 Voltaire, his work in audio version   

 
1694 births
1778 deaths
18th century in Geneva
18th-century French dramatists and playwrights
18th-century French novelists
18th-century French male writers
18th-century French philosophers
Antisemitism in France
Islamophobia in Europe
Burials at the Panthéon, Paris
Contributors to the Encyclopédie (1751–1772)
Critics of religions
Deist philosophers
Enlightenment philosophers
Epistemologists
Exophonic writers
Fellows of the Royal Society
Free speech activists
French anti–death penalty activists
French deists
French dramatists and playwrights
French essayists
French fantasy writers
French Freemasons
18th-century French historians
French male dramatists and playwrights
French male poets
French monarchists
18th-century French poets
French satirists
French science fiction writers
Honorary members of the Saint Petersburg Academy of Sciences
Humor researchers
Les Neuf Sœurs
Liberalism in France
Lycée Louis-le-Grand alumni
Members of the Académie Française
Members of the Prussian Academy of Sciences
Metaphysicians
Ontologists
People imprisoned by lettre de cachet
People of the Ancien Régime
People of the Regency of Philippe d'Orléans
Philosophers of art
Philosophers of culture
Philosophers of education
Philosophers of history
Philosophers of language
Philosophers of literature
Philosophers of mind
Philosophers of science
Philosophers of sexuality
Philosophes
Political philosophers
Prisoners of the Bastille
Recipients of the Pour le Mérite (civil class)
French social commentators
Social philosophers
Theorists on Western civilization
Writers about activism and social change
Writers about religion and science
Writers from Paris
18th-century French memoirists
18th-century pseudonymous writers
World historians